Japan competed at the 2012 Summer Paralympics in London.  Japan's team consisted of 116 competitors.

Medalists

Archery

Men

|-
|align=left|Shinichi Saito
|align=left|Ind. compound W1
|563
|11
|
| (6)L 2–6
|colspan=4|did not advance
|-
|align=left|Yutaka Ajima
|align=left|Ind. recurve W1/W2
|539
|22
| (11)L 0–6
|colspan=5|did not advance
|}

Women

|-
|align=left|Miho Nagano
|align=left|Ind. compound open
|614
|11
|
| (6)W 6–5
| (3)L 4–6
|colspan=3|did not advance
|}

Athletics

Boccia

Individual

Teams

Cycling

Track

Pursuit

Sprint

Time trial

Road

Equestrian

Individual

Goalball

Women's tournament

Group C

Quarter-final

Semi-final

Final

Judo

Powerlifting

Men

Rowing

Sailing

* Due to a lack of wind race 11 was cancelled

Shooting

Sitting volleyball

Women's tournament
Roster

Group A

5th–8th place semi-final

7th/8th place match

Swimming

Table tennis

Men's singles

Women's singles

Wheelchair basketball

Men's tournament

Group B

9th/10th place match

Wheelchair rugby

Group stage

Semi-finals

Bronze medal match

Wheelchair tennis

See also
Japan at the 2012 Summer Olympics

References

Nations at the 2012 Summer Paralympics
2012
Paralympics